The men's 3 metre springboard, also reported as springboard diving, was one of four diving events on the Diving at the 1932 Summer Olympics programme.
For the first time, the competition was held exclusively from the 3 metre springboard. Divers performed five compulsory dives – running pike dive forward, standing backward straight somersault, standing Mollberg (full gainer) with tuck, standing backward spring somersault with pike, standing forward screw – and five dives of the competitor's choice (different from the compulsory) for a total of ten dives. The competition was held on Monday 8 August 1932. Thirteen divers from seven nations competed.

Results
Since there were only thirteen entries, instead of groups, a direct final was contested.

Final

References

Sources
  

Men
1932
Men's events at the 1932 Summer Olympics